Francheska: Prairie Queen is a Canadian documentary film, directed by Laura O'Grady and slated for release in 2022. The film is a portrait of Francis Yutrago, a gay immigrant to Canada from the Philippines who performs as a drag queen under the name Francheska Dynamites in Lethbridge, Alberta.

Francheska was previously profiled in an episode of the CBC Gem web series Canada's a Drag in 2020.

The film premiered at the Calgary International Film Festival.

The film was longlisted for the Directors Guild of Canada's 2022 Jean-Marc Vallée DGC Discovery Award.

References 

2022 films
2022 documentary films
2022 LGBT-related films
Canadian LGBT-related films
Canadian documentary films
Drag (clothing)-related films
Documentary films about LGBT topics
English-language Canadian films
2020s Canadian films
Films about Asian Canadians